Sierra Blanca is a mountain range of the Penibaetic System in Málaga Province, Andalusia, Spain. Its highest point is the 1,275 m high Pico del Lastonar. It is the closest mountain to Marbella.

The Sierra Blanca, meaning 'White Range', is named after the lack of vegetation on its slopes which leaves the pale grey limestone rock exposed.

Geography
This karstic mountain range is part of the ranges fringing the Mediterranean coastline in the Costa del Sol area. It is located between the coast and the Sierra de las Nieves in the municipal terms of Istán, Ojén, Marbella and Monda. The easiest route to reach it is from Marbella town.

The Pico de la Concha (1,270 m), meaning 'Seashell Peak', resembles a seashell seen from the west and is the second highest summit of the range. Other notable peaks are the Salto del Lobo (1,225 m), Cerro de la Zarina (1,141 m) and the Cruz de Juanar (1,178 m).

Ecologist organizations in the area have proposed that the Sierra Blanca be declared a protected area, in a similar manner as the Sierra de las Nieves Natural Park located in the neighboring range.

See also
Baetic System
Geology of the Iberian Peninsula
Marbella blast furnaces
List of Sites of Community Importance in Spain

References

External links 

 Sierra Blanca (Ojén)
Los Pilares de Sierra Blanca
Hiking in Sierra Blanca

Blanca
Blanca
Geography of the Province of Málaga